Ziegra-Knobelsdorf is a former municipality in the district of Mittelsachsen, in Saxony, Germany. It has been dissolved with effect from 1 January 2013. The villages of Forchheim, Kleinlimmritz, Limmritz, Poschwitz, Schweta, Stockhausen, Töpeln, Wöllsdorf and Ziegra have been incorporated into Döbeln, Gebersbach, Heyda, Kaiserburg, Knobelsdorf, Meinsberg, Neuhausen and Rudelsdorf into Waldheim.

References 

Former municipalities in Saxony